The word "ain't" is a contraction for am not, is not, are not, has not, and have not in the common English language vernacular. In some dialects ain't is also used as a contraction of do not, does not, and did not. The development of ain't for the various forms of to be not, to have not, and to do not occurred independently, at different times. The usage of ain't for the forms of to be not was established by the mid-18th century and for the forms of to have not by the early 19th century.

The usage of ain't is a continuing subject of controversy in English. Ain't is commonly used by many speakers in oral and informal settings, especially in certain regions and dialects. Its usage is often highly stigmatized and it can be used by the general public as a marker of low socio-economic or regional status or education level. Its use is generally considered non-standard by dictionaries and style guides except when used for rhetorical effect.

Etymology
Ain't has several antecedents in English, corresponding to the various forms of to be not and to have not that ain't contracts. The development of ain't for to be not and to have not is a diachronic coincidence; in other words, they were independent developments at different times.

Contractions of to be not
Amn't as a contraction of am not is known from 1618. As the "mn" combination of two nasal consonants is disfavoured by many English speakers, the "m" of amn't began to be elided, reflected in writing with the new form an't. Aren't as a contraction for are not first appeared in 1675. In non-rhotic dialects, aren't lost its "r" sound, and began to be pronounced as an't.

An't (sometimes a'n't) arose from am not and are not almost simultaneously. An't first appears in print in the work of English Restoration playwrights. In 1695 an't was used as a contraction of "am not", in William Congreve's play Love for Love: "I can hear you farther off, I an't deaf". But as early as 1696 Sir John Vanbrugh uses an't to mean "are not" in The Relapse: "Hark thee shoemaker! These shoes an't ugly, but they don't fit me".

An't for is not may have developed independently from its use for am not and are not. Isn't was sometimes written as in't or en't, which could have changed into an't. An't for is not may also have filled a gap as an extension of the already-used conjugations for to be not. Jonathan Swift used an't to mean is not in Letter 19 of his Journal to Stella (1710–13): It an't my fault, 'tis Patrick's fault; pray now don't blame Presto.

An't with a long "a" sound began to be written as ain't, which first appears in writing in 1749. By the time ain't appeared, an't was already being used for am not, are not and is not. An't and ain't coexisted as written forms well into the nineteenth century—Charles Dickens used the terms interchangeably, as in Chapter 13, Book the Second of Little Dorrit (1857): "'I guessed it was you, Mr Pancks", said she, 'for it's quite your regular night; ain't it? ... An't it gratifying, Mr Pancks, though; really?'". In the English lawyer William Hickey's memoirs (1808–1810), ain't appears as a contraction of aren't; "thank God we're all alive, ain't we..."

Contractions of to have not
Han't or ha'n't, an early contraction for has not and have not, developed from the elision of the "s" of has not and the "v" of have not. Han't appeared in the work of English Restoration playwrights, as in The Country Wife (1675) by William Wycherley: Gentlemen and Ladies, han't you all heard the late sad report / of poor Mr. Horner. Much like an't, han't was sometimes pronounced with a long "a", yielding hain't. With H-dropping, the "h" of han't or hain't gradually disappeared in most dialects and became ain't.

Ain't as a contraction for has not/have not first appeared in dictionaries in the 1830s and appeared in 1819 in Niles' Weekly Register: Strike! Why I ain't got nobody here to strike.... Charles Dickens likewise used ain't to mean haven't in Chapter 28 of Martin Chuzzlewit (1844): "You ain't got nothing to cry for, bless you! He's righter than a trivet!"

Like with an't, han't and ain't were found together late into the nineteenth century, as in Chapter 12 of Dickens' Our Mutual Friend: "'Well, have you finished?' asked the strange man. 'No,' said Riderhood, 'I ain't'....'You sir! You han't said what you want of me.'"

Contractions of to do not
Ain't meaning didn't is widely considered a feature unique to African-American Vernacular English, although it can be found in some dialects of Caribbean English as well.  It may function not as a true variant of didn't, but as a creole-like tense-neutral negator (sometimes termed "generic ain't"). Its origin may have been due to approximation when early African-Americans acquired English as a second language; it is also possible that early African-Americans inherited this variation from colonial European-Americans and later kept the variation when it largely passed out of wider usage. Besides the standard construction ain't got, ain't is rarely attested for the present-tense constructions do not or does not.

Linguistic characteristics
Linguistically, ain't is formed by the same rule that English speakers use to form aren't and other contractions of auxiliary verbs. Linguists consider usage of ain't to be grammatical, as long as its users convey their intended meaning to their audience. In other words, a sentence such as "She ain't got no sense" is grammatical because it generally follows a native speaker's word order, and because a native speaker would recognize the meaning of that sentence. Linguists draw a distinction, however, between grammaticality and acceptability: what may be considered grammatical across all dialects may nevertheless be considered not acceptable in certain dialects or contexts. The usage of ain't is socially unacceptable in some situations.

Functionally, ain't has operated in part to plug what is known as the "amn't gap" – the anomalous situation in standard English whereby there are standard contractions for other forms of to be not (aren't for are not, and isn't for is not), but no standard contraction for am not. Historically, ain't has filled the gap where one might expect amn't, even in contexts where other uses of ain't were disfavored. Standard dialects that regard ain't as non-standard often substitute aren't for am not in tag questions (e.g., "I'm doing okay, aren't I?"), while leaving the "amn't gap" open in declarative statements.

Proscription and stigma
Ain't has been called "the most stigmatized word in the language", as well as "the most powerful social marker" in English. It is a prominent example in English of a shibboleth – a word used to determine inclusion in or exclusion from, a group.

Historically, this was not the case. For most of its history, ain't was acceptable across many social and regional contexts. Throughout the 17th, 18th and 19th centuries, ain't and its predecessors were part of normal usage for both educated and uneducated English speakers and was found in the correspondence and fiction of, among others, Jonathan Swift, Lord Byron, Henry Fielding and George Eliot. For Victorian English novelists William Makepeace Thackeray and Anthony Trollope, the educated and upper classes in 19th century England could use ain't freely, but in familiar speech only. Ain't continued to be used without restraint by many upper middle class speakers in southern England into the beginning of the 20th century.

Ain't was a prominent target of early prescriptivist writers. In the 18th and early 19th centuries, some writers began to propound the need to establish a "pure" or "correct" form of English. Contractions in general were disapproved of, but ain't and its variants were seen as particularly "vulgar". This push for "correctness" was driven mainly by the middle class, which led to an incongruous situation in which non-standard constructions continued to be used by both lower and upper classes, but not by the middle class. The reason for the strength of the proscription against ain't is not entirely clear.

The strong proscription against ain't in standard English has led to many misconceptions, often expressed jocularly (or ironically), as "ain't ain't a word" or "ain't ain't in the dictionary." Ain't is listed in most dictionaries, including the Oxford Dictionary of English and Merriam-Webster. However, Oxford states "it does not form part of standard English and should never be used in formal or written contexts" and Merriam-Webster states it is "widely disapproved as non-standard and more common in the habitual speech of the less educated".

Webster's Third New International Dictionary, published in 1961, went against then-standard practice when it included the following usage note in its entry on : "though disapproved by many and more common in less educated speech, used orally in most parts of the U.S. by many cultivated speakers esp. in the phrase ain't I." Many commentators disapproved of the dictionary's relatively permissive attitude toward the word, which was inspired, in part, by the belief of its editor, Philip Gove, that "distinctions of usage were elitist and artificial".

Regional usage and dialects

Ain't is found throughout the English-speaking world across regions and classes and is among the most pervasive nonstandard terms in English. It is one of two negation features (the other being the double negative) that are known to appear in all nonstandard English dialects. Ain't is used throughout the United Kingdom, with its geographical distribution increasing over time. It is also found throughout most of North America, including in Appalachia, the South, New England, the Mid-Atlantic and the Upper Midwest of the United States and Canada, particularly in rural communities and the Western Provinces. In its geographical ubiquity, ain't is to be contrasted with other folk usages such as y'all, which is strongly associated with the Southern United States.

In England, ain't is generally considered a non-standard usage, as it is used by speakers of a lower socio-economic class or by educated people in an informal manner. In the nineteenth century, ain't was often used by writers to denote regional dialects such as Cockney English. A notable exponent of the term is Cockney flower girl Eliza Doolittle from George Bernard Shaw's play Pygmalion;  "I ain't done nothing wrong by speaking to the gentleman" said Doolittle. Ain't is a non-standard feature commonly found in mainstream Australian English and in New Zealand, ain't is a feature of Māori-influenced English. In American English, usage of ain't corresponds to a middle level of education, although it is widely believed that its use establishes of lack of education or social standing in the speaker.

The usage of ain't in the southern United States is distinctive, however, in the continued usage of the word by well-educated, cultivated speakers. Ain't is in common usage of educated Southerners. In the South, the use of ain't can be used as a marker to separate cultured speakers from those who lack confidence in their social standing and thus avoid its use entirely.

Rhetorical and popular usage

Ain't can be used in both speech and writing to catch attention and to give emphasis, as in "Ain't that a crying shame" or "If it ain't broke, don't fix it." Merriam-Webster's Collegiate Dictionary gives an example from film critic Richard Schickel: "the wackiness of movies, once so deliciously amusing, ain't funny anymore." It can also be used deliberately for what The Oxford Dictionary of American Usage and Style describes as "tongue-in-cheek" or "reverse snobbery". Star baseball pitcher Dizzy Dean, a member of the Baseball Hall of Fame and later a popular announcer, once said, "A lot of people who don't say ain't, ain't eatin'."

Although ain't is seldom found in formal writing, it is frequently used in more informal written settings, such as popular song lyrics. In genres such as traditional country music, blues, rock n' roll and hip-hop, lyrics often include nonstandard features such as ain't. This is principally due to the use of such features as markers of "covert identity and prestige".

Ain't is standard in some fixed phrases, such as "You ain't seen nothing yet".

Notable usage

 "Ain't I a Woman?", 1851 speech by abolitionist Sojourner Truth.
 "If you want to know who we are", from The Mikado lyrics by W. S. Gilbert "We figure in lively paint: Our attitude's queer and quaint—You're wrong if you think it ain't." (1885).
 "Say it ain't so, Joe", headline of an article by a Chicago Daily News reporter about Shoeless Joe Jackson's involvement in the Black Sox scandal, later attributed to an anonymous young baseball fan.
 "You ain't heard nothing yet!" spoken by Al Jolson in The Jazz Singer (1927), the first feature-length motion picture with synchronized dialogue sequences. That spoken line and others in the film, introduced the "talkies" and revolutionized the movie industry.
 "It Ain't Necessarily So", song from Porgy and Bess (1935); music by George Gershwin, words by Ira Gershwin.
 "Ain't No Grave", a 1934/1953 American gospel song attributed to Claude Ely.
 "He ain't heavy, he's my brother" has been used as the motto of Boys Town since 1943 and inspired a song "He Ain't Heavy, He's My Brother", written by Bobby Scott and Bob Russell and recorded by The Hollies, Neil Diamond and other artists.
 Winston Churchill, commenting on the 1954 portrait by Graham Sutherland, said "It makes me look half-witted, which I ain't".
 "Ain't That a Shame" is a song written by Fats Domino and Dave Bartholomew, released by Imperial Records in 1955, which went on to sell over a million copies and introduced Fats Domino to a wider audience.
 Fings Ain't Wot They Used T'Be, 1960 West End musical comedy about Cockney life.

See also
 English auxiliary verbs
 English usage controversies

References

Further reading
 Anderwald, Liselotte. Negation in Non-Standard British English. Routledge. 27 August 2003.
 "ain't", Merriam-Webster's dictionary of English usage (1995) pp. 60–64 online

American slang
British slang
Nonstandard English grammar
Slang of the Southern United States